Himanshu A. Malhotra (born Himanshu Malhotra) is an Indian actor. He is the winner of Nach Baliye 7 and later participated in Fear Factor: Khatron Ke Khiladi 7.

Personal life 
He married Amruta Khanvilkar on 24 January 2015 in Delhi.

Career
Malhotra first came to light when he was selected to participate in Zee TV's India's Best Cinestars Ki Khoj in 2004. The actor is a familiar face on Indian television as he has appeared in various shows like Hum Tum, Bindass Champ, Seven, Shubh Kadam, Aap Ki Antara, and Bhagonwali-Baante Apni Taqdeer. Himanshu made his Bollywood debut in Raj Sippy's Mr. Khujli. Along with his recurring roles, he had special appearances in several shows like Star One's Horror Nights, Imagine's Kitani Mohabbat Hai 2, and Zee TV's Pavitra Rishta. He was also seen in Sony's Love Marriage Ya Arranged Marriage as Anoop. He has appeared in Zee TV's Rab Se Sona Ishq. He was seen in Yeh Hai Aashiqui on Bindass opposite Shivshakti Sachdev, Encounter on Sony TV and Fear Files on Zee TV. He also essayed an important role in Airlines on Star Plus. He participated in Nach Baliye 7 with wife Amruta Khanvilkar and won. He also joined the cast of Ek Nayi Ummeed – Roshni as Dr. Sameer Purohit on Life Ok.

He was seen in Bollywood crime thriller film Wajah Tum Ho, which was released in late 2016.

Filmography

Films

Television

References

External links

 
 

1982 births
Living people
21st-century Indian male actors
Indian male film actors
Indian male voice actors
Male actors from New Delhi
Fear Factor: Khatron Ke Khiladi participants
Punjabi Hindus